There are several skateboarding dogs whose exploits have been featured upon TV, websites and other media.  Skateboarding dog stories are commonly used at the end of news bulletins as human interest stories.  Bulldogs are especially good at this activity as they have a low centre of gravity and wide body.

Such dogs have been featured on television, such as in the MTV show Rob and Big. One skateboarding dog named Tyson appeared in this show and has since been featured on many websites as the pioneer of skateboarding dogs. Another bulldog, Tillman, has appeared in Greatest American Dog. Tillman holds the Guinness World Record for "Fastest 100 m on a skateboard by a dog."

Dogs can be trained to ride skateboards by familiarising them with a skateboard in stages and rewarding the dog as it becomes more comfortable and accomplished. A children's book was published on this subject in 2006: Little Yellow Dog Says Look At Me. In this fictional story, the dog skateboards for attention.

See also
 Dog surfing
 Skateboarding duck

References

External links
Website of Bamboo the skateboarding mutt

Dog sports
Skateboarding mass media